The Northern Muya Range is a mountain range in Buryatia, Russia, part of the Stanovoy Highlands.

The Baikal Amur Mainline (BAM) railway traverses the southern end of the mountain range via the Severomuysky Tunnel.

Geography
The Northern Muya Range stretches from the valley of the Svetlaya river, a left tributary of the Upper Angara, in the southwest, to the valley of the Vitim in the northeast. The Upper Angara Depression lies to the northwest and the Muya-Kuanda Depression to the southeast. To the north it runs parallel with the Delyun-Uran Range just south of it, and to the south with the Muyakan Range. Peaks and ridges have sharp glacial shapes in the central sector of the range, while flat summits predominate on the periphery. In its southwestern part the Northern Muya Range is broken by the valley of the Kotera.

Hydrography
The Northern Muya Range separates the basins of the Upper Angara and Muya Rivers.
Among the rivers having their sources in the range are the Upper Angara and its left tributaries Yanchui and Angarakan, several Vitim tributaries, such as the Mamakan and Muya, as well as rivers Parama and Yanguda, originate from it.

Flora
The slopes of the range are mainly covered with larch taiga, with mountain tundra above . The river valleys are swampy with meadows and pine forests on the lower slopes and the north-facing sides.

See also
List of mountains and hills of Russia
Southern Muya Range

References

External links

Mountain ranges of Russia
Physiographic provinces
Mountains of Buryatia
Stanovoy Highlands